Stamnophora vernoniicola is a species of tephritid or fruit flies in the genus Stamnophora of the family Tephritidae.

Distribution
Eritrea, Kenya, Uganda, Malawi, South Africa.

References

Tephritinae
Insects described in 1920
Taxa named by Mario Bezzi
Diptera of Africa